Pygmy Island is a 1950 Jungle Jim film starring Johnny Weissmuller as the title character. It was movie number five in the series.

Production
Filming started 19 June 1950. Katzman hired several midget actors to play pygmies. The film was shot over 14 days.

References

External links

Pygmy Island at TCMDB
Review of film at Variety
Pygmy Island at Johnny Weissmuller fan site

1950 films
Jungle Jim films
Columbia Pictures films
American adventure films
1950 drama films
American black-and-white films
Films directed by William A. Berke
1950s English-language films
1950s American films